"Lazdynai" is also an old name of Krasnoznamensk, Kaliningrad Oblast, Russia

Lazdynai is an eldership of Vilnius, Lithuania, situated on the right bank of the Neris River. The word means "hazel bushes" in Lithuanian.

History

Since the 1950s, the Baltic states experienced fast population growth and faced housing shortages. When Soviet leader Nikita Khrushchev put forth his program of fast residential construction, based on prefabricated panel buildings dubbed khrushchovkas, it threatened the integrity of the well-preserved historical style of Vilnius. A group of architects struggled against the intrusion of khrushchovkas'' into the historical city center. Eventually they were awarded with the project to build a satellite city outside Vilnius. The chosen area was close to a Polish village of Leszczyniaki or Lazdynai in Lithuanian, situated southeast of old Vilnius.

The architects decided to go against the Soviet architectural style and based their design on study of the architecture of Finland. Initially the authorities monitored the project with suspicion, but eventually it was accepted, and in 1974 the leading figures of the Lazdynai project (architects Vytautas Čekanauskas, Vytautas Brėdikis, Vytautas Balčiūnas, and Gediminas Valiuškis and engineers Algimantas Kleinotas and  Vincentas Šileika) were awarded the Lenin Prize in architecture.

See also
Vilnius Minties Gymnasium

Notes

References

Neighbourhoods of Vilnius